Cockermouth was the name of a constituency of the House of Commons of the Parliament of England in 1295, and again from 1641, then of the Parliament of Great Britain from 1707 to 1800 and of the Parliament of the United Kingdom from 1801 to 1918. It was a parliamentary borough represented by two Members of Parliament until 1868, and by one member from 1868 to 1885. The name was then transferred to a county constituency electing one MP from 1885 until 1918.

Notable MPs have included the regicide, Francis Allen.

The borough constituency (until 1885)

Until the Great Reform Act of 1832, the constituency consisted solely of the market town of Cockermouth in Cumberland. It first returned members to the Model Parliament of 1295, but its franchise then seems to have lapsed until 1641, when the Long Parliament passed a resolution (15 February 1641) to restore its ancient privileges.

The right of election in Cockermouth was vested in the burgage tenants of the borough, of whom there were about 300 in 1832. Cockermouth was considered a pocket borough, with the vast majority of the voters being under the influence of the Lowther family.

At the time of the 1831 census, the borough included just over 1,000 houses and had a population of 4,536. The Reform Act expanded the boundaries to bring in the neighbouring parishes of Eaglesfield, Brigham, Papcastle and Bridekirk, and part of Dovenby, increasing the population to 6,022 and encompassing 1,325 houses. This made the borough big enough to retain both its members. However, in the next wave of reform, introduced at the 1868 general election, one of Cockermouth's two seats was withdrawn, and in 1885 the borough was abolished altogether, although the name was transferred to the surrounding county constituency.

The county constituency (1885-1918)
The Cockermouth constituency created in 1885, strictly speaking The Cockermouth Division of Cumberland, was a compact division stretching westwards from Cockermouth to the sea, and including the much larger town of Workington. There was a significant Irish vote, and the Conservative victory in 1885 and subsequent Liberal gain of the seat in 1886 have been attributed to Parnell's shift of support from the one party to the other.

The constituency was divided between the new Workington and Penrith and Cockermouth divisions of Cumberland from 1918.

Members of Parliament
Cockermouth re-enfranchised by Parliament in Nov 1640

MPs 1641–1868

MPs 1868–1885

MPs 1885–1918 
Cockermouth Division of Cumberland

Elections

Elections in the 1830s

 

 

 

 

Dykes resigned, causing a by-election.

Elections in the 1840s
Horsman was appointed a Lord Commissioner of the Treasury, requiring a by-election.

Elections in the 1850s

 

Aglionby's death caused a by-election.

Bourke was appointed Chief Secretary to the Lord Lieutenant of Ireland, requiring a by-election.

Elections in the 1860s

Bourke was appointed Chief Secretary to the Lord Lieutenant of Ireland, requiring a by-election.

Steel's death caused a by-election.

Seat reduced to one member

Elections in the 1870s 

Fletcher's suicide caused a by-election.

Elections in the 1880s

Elections in the 1890s

Elections in the 1900s

Elections in the 1910s 

General Election 1914–15:

Another General Election was required to take place before the end of 1915. The political parties had been making preparations for an election to take place and by the July 1914, the following candidates had been selected; 
Liberal: Wilfrid Lawson
Unionist: Daniel Johnston Mason
Labour:Thomas Cape

References

 D Brunton & D H Pennington, "Members of the Long Parliament" (London: George Allen & Unwin, 1954)
Cobbett's Parliamentary history of England, from the Norman Conquest in 1066 to the year 1803 (London: Thomas Hansard, 1808) 
 F W S Craig, "British Parliamentary Election Results 1832-1885" (2nd edition, Aldershot: Parliamentary Research Services, 1989)
 Michael Kinnear, "The British Voter" (London: Batsford, 1968)
 J Holladay Philbin, "Parliamentary Representation 1832 - England and Wales" (New Haven: Yale University Press, 1965)
 Henry Stooks Smith, "The Parliaments of England from 1715 to 1847" (2nd edition, edited by FWS Craig - Chichester: Parliamentary Reference Publications, 1973)
 Frederic A Youngs, jr, "Guide to the Local Administrative Units of England, Vol II" (London: Royal Historical Society, 1991)
 "The Constitutional Yearbook, 1913" (London: National Unionist Association, 1913)

Parliamentary constituencies in North West England (historic)
Constituencies of the Parliament of the United Kingdom established in 1295
Constituencies of the Parliament of the United Kingdom disestablished in 1918
Constituencies of the Parliament of the United Kingdom established in 1640
Cockermouth